Akhmed Musaevich Idrisov (born 7 November 1999) is a Russian freestyle wrestler from Dagestan who competes at 57 kilograms. Idrisov is the reigning U23 European Continental champion, a medalist from the Golden Grand Prix Ivan Yarygin 2020 and the 2020 Russian National Championships and was the 2018 Junior World Champion.

Major results

Career 
In September 2018, Idrisov became the Junior World Champion at men's freestyle 57 kg. His first international tournament came in November 2018, placing fifth at the Intercontinental Cup. In August 2019, Idrisov placed third at the Junior World Championships, only losing to Cadet World Championship silver medalist Vitali Arujau from the United States. By December 2019, Idrisov claimed the senior level Alans International championship. During 2020, he placed second at the Golden Grand Prix Ivan Yarygin and third at the Russian National Championships. As of 2021, Idrisov has become the U23 European Continental champion.

Freestyle record 

! colspan="7"| International Senior Freestyle Matches
|-
!  Res.
!  Record
!  Opponent
!  Score
!  Date
!  Event
!  Location
|-
! style=background:white colspan=7 |
|-
|Win
|19–4
|align=left| Aliabbas Rzazade
|style="font-size:88%"|6–0
|style="font-size:88%" rowspan=3|May 17–23, 2021 
|style="font-size:88%" rowspan=3|2021 U23 European Continental Championships
|style="text-align:left;font-size:88%;" rowspan=3|
 Skopje, North Macedonia
|-
|Win
|18–4
|align=left| Kamil Kerymov
|style="font-size:88%"|TF 10–0
|-
|Win
|17–4
|align=left| Ramaz Turmanidze
|style="font-size:88%"|TF 13–2
|-
! style=background:white colspan=7 |
|-
|Win
|16–4
|align=left| Ramiz Gamzatov
|style="font-size:88%"|3–1
|style="font-size:88%" rowspan=4|October 16–18, 2020
|style="font-size:88%" rowspan=4|2020 Russian National Championships
|style="text-align:left;font-size:88%;" rowspan=4|
 Naro-Fominsk, Russia
|-
|Win
|15–4
|align=left| Said Gazimagomedov
|style="font-size:88%"|4–4
|-
|Loss
|14–4
|align=left| Azamat Tuskaev
|style="font-size:88%"|6–6
|-
|Win
|14–3
|align=left| Donduk-ool Khuresh-ool
|style="font-size:88%"|TF 12–1
|-
! style=background:white colspan=7 |
|-
|Loss
|13–3
|align=left| Azamat Tuskaev
|style="font-size:88%"|3–10
|style="font-size:88%" rowspan=4|January 23–26, 2020 
|style="font-size:88%" rowspan=4|Golden Grand Prix Ivan Yarygin 2020
|style="text-align:left;font-size:88%;" rowspan=4|
 Krasnoyarsk, Russia
|-
|Win
|13–2
|align=left| Aryan Tsiutryn
|style="font-size:88%"|12–9
|-
|Win
|12–2
|align=left| Petr Konstantinov
|style="font-size:88%"|7–2
|-
|Win
|11–2
|align=left| Zanabazar Zandanbud
|style="font-size:88%"|TF 10–0
|-
! style=background:white colspan=7 |
|-
|Win
|10–2
|align=left| Erdenebatyn Bekhbayar
|style="font-size:88%"|5–2
|style="font-size:88%" rowspan=5|December 7–8, 2019 
|style="font-size:88%" rowspan=5|2019 Alans International
|style="text-align:left;font-size:88%;" rowspan=5|
 Vladikavkaz, Russia
|-
|Win
|9–2
|align=left| Abubakar Mutaliev
|style="font-size:88%"|Fall
|-
|Win
|8–2
|align=left| Kezhik Mongush
|style="font-size:88%"|TF 14–4
|-
|Win
|7–2
|align=left| Azamat Tuskaev
|style="font-size:88%"|4–0
|-
|Win
|6–2
|align=left| Garik Barseghyan
|style="font-size:88%"|8–0
|-
! style=background:white colspan=7 |
|-
|Win
|5–2
|align=left| Giorgi Edisherashvili
|style="font-size:88%"|9–4
|style="font-size:88%"|October 26, 2019
|style="font-size:88%" rowspan=2|2019–2020 Deutsche Ringerliga season
|style="text-align:left;font-size:88%;" rowspan=2|
 Germany
|-
|Win
|4–2
|align=left| Reineri Andreu
|style="font-size:88%"|7–0
|style="font-size:88%"|October 12, 2019
|-
! style=background:white colspan=7 |
|-
|Loss
|3–2
|align=left| Jabrail Gairbekov
|style="font-size:88%"|2–9
|style="font-size:88%" rowspan=5|November 15–19, 2018 
|style="font-size:88%" rowspan=5|2018 Intercontinental Cup
|style="text-align:left;font-size:88%;" rowspan=5|
 Khasavyurt, Dagestan
|-
|Loss
|3–1
|align=left| Ramis Gamzatov
|style="font-size:88%"|0–2
|-
|Win
|3–0
|align=left| Islam Bazarganov
|style="font-size:88%"|4–3
|-
|Win
|2–0
|align=left| Mirjalal Hasan Zada
|style="font-size:88%"|7–4
|-
|Win
|1–0
|align=left| Abdumazhid Kudiev
|style="font-size:88%"|6–2
|-

References 

1999 births
Living people
People from Khasavyurt
Russian male sport wrestlers
Sportspeople from Dagestan
21st-century Russian people